This is a list of the main career statistics of Spanish professional tennis player, Garbiñe Muguruza. To date, she has won 15 WTA Tour-level tournaments, winning ten of them in singles and five in doubles. In her titles collection, she also has seven singles and one doubles titles on the ITF Circuit. Having good performances at the majors, she won the French Open title in 2016 and then the following year at Wimbledon. Along with that, she reached two more Grand Slam finals (2015 Wimbledon and 2020 Australian Open). 

At the 2021 WTA Finals, she reached her first final there, and won the title defeating Anett Kontaveit. Muguruza reached her career-high ranking of world No. 1 on 11 September 2017. In 2015, when her breakthrough happened, she reached her first WTA 1000 final at the Wuhan Open. The following week, she won her first WTA 1000-level tournament at the China Open. Later, she won two more WTA 1000 titles; at the 2017 Cincinnati Open and the 2021 Dubai Championships. 

Being more recognized for her singles results, she done well in doubles as well. Most significant results are the finals at the 2017 WTA Finals and three more from the WTA 1000 tier. She also reached semifinals at the 2014 French Open. All mentioned doubles achievements she made alongside compatriot Carla Suárez Navarro. On the 23 February 2015, she had her top 10 debut in the doubles rankings as No. 10, her highest up to date.

Performance timelines

Only main-draw results in WTA Tour, Grand Slam tournaments, Fed Cup/Billie Jean King Cup and Olympic Games are included in Win–loss records.

Singles
Current through the 2023 Lyon Open.

Doubles
Current through the Tennis at the 2020 Summer Olympics.

Grand Slam tournament finals

Singles: 4 (2 titles, 2 runner-ups)

Other significant finals

Year-end championships finals

Singles: 1 (1 title)

Doubles: 1 (1 runner-up)

WTA 1000 finals

Singles: 5 (3 titles, 2 runner-ups)

Doubles: 3 (3 runner-ups)

WTA career finals

Singles: 17 (10 titles, 7 runner-ups)

Doubles: 10 (5 titles, 5 runner-ups)

ITF Circuit finals

Singles: 13 (7 titles, 6 runner-ups)

Doubles: 2 (1 title, 1 runner-up)

WTA Tour career earnings
Current as of 2022 US Open.

Career Grand Slam statistics

Seedings 
The tournaments won by Muguruza are in boldface, and advanced into finals by Muguruza are in italics.

Best Grand Slam results details

Head to head

Record against top 10 players

Muguruza's record against players who have been ranked in the top 10. Active players are in boldface.

No. 1 wins

Top 10 wins

Notes

References

Muguruza, Garbine
career